The 2000–01 Segunda División B season was the 24th edition of the tournament. It started in August 2000 and ended in May 2001.

Summary before the 2000–01 season 
Playoffs de Ascenso:

 Universidad de Las Palmas (P) 
 Ourense
 Racing de Ferrol (P) 
 Mensajero
 Gimnástica de Torrelavega
 Zaragoza B 
 Burgos
 Barakaldo
 Gandía
 Murcia (P)   
 Gramenet 
 Hércules
 Granada 
 Ceuta 
 Xerez  
 Jaén (P) 

Relegated from Segunda División:

 Atlético Madrid B
 Toledo
 Mérida (dissolved)
 Logroñés (relegated to Tercera División)

Promoted from Tercera División:

 Deportivo La Coruña B (from Group 1)
 Siero (from Group 2)
 AD Universidad de Oviedo (from Group 2)
 Tropezón (from Group 3)
 Racing de Santander B (from Group 3)
 Eibar B (from Group 4)
 Espanyol B (from Group 5)
 Mataró (from Group 5)
 Burriana (from Group 6)
 Benidorm (from Group 6)
 Alcorcón (from Group 7)
 Ejido (from Group 9)
 Linares (from Group 9)
 Almería (from Group 9)
 Algeciras (from Group 10)
 Vecindario (from Group 12)
 Peña Sport (from Group 15)

Relegated:

 Lanzarote
 Oviedo B
 Gimnástica Segoviana
 Móstoles
 Bermeo
 Valladolid B
 Figueruelas
 Izarra
 Valencia B
 Yeclano
 Ontinyent
 Lorca
 Betis B
 Cacereño
 Sevilla B
 Águilas
 Avilés
 Fuenlabrada

Dissolved:
 Manchego

Occupied the vacant spots by administrative relegations:
 Chantrea (occupied the vacant spot of Logroñés)

Occupied the vacant spots by clubs dissolutions:
 San Fernando (occupied the vacant spot of Manchego)
 Don Benito (occupied the vacant spot of Mérida)

Group I
Teams from Asturias, Canary Islands, Castile and León, Castilla–La Mancha, Community of Madrid and Galicia.

Teams

League table

Results

Top goalscorers

Top goalkeepers

Group II
Teams from Aragon, Basque Country, Cantabria, Castile and León, La Rioja and Navarre.

Teams

League Table

Results

Top goalscorers

Top goalkeepers

Group III
Teams from Balearic Islands, Castilla–La Mancha, Catalonia, Region of Murcia and Valencian Community.

Teams

League Table

Results

Top goalscorers

Top goalkeepers

Group IV
Teams from Andalusia, Castilla–La Mancha, Ceuta, Extremadura and Melilla.

Teams

League Table 

1. Polideportivo Almería withdrew after 18 games.

Results

Top goalscorers

Top goalkeepers

Play-offs

Group A

Group B

Group C

Group D

Play-out

Semifinal

Final

External links
Playoff results

 
Segunda División B seasons

3
Spain